opened in Onomichi, Hiroshima Prefecture, Japan, in 1997. The collection includes works by Corot, Renoir, Cézanne, and Umehara Ryūzaburō.

See also
 Onomichi City Museum of Art
 List of Cultural Properties of Japan - paintings (Hiroshima)

References

External links
  Nakata Museum

Museums in Hiroshima Prefecture
Onomichi, Hiroshima
Art museums and galleries in Japan
Museums established in 1997
1997 establishments in Japan